Holding On To Whatever It Is is an album by The Waking Eyes, released in 2008.

It was released on July 1, 2008 on iTunes, and a physical CD was released in stores on November 4, 2008.

Track listing
 "Holding On To Whatever It Is"
 "Get Me to the Doctor"
 "All Empires Fall"
 "Wolves at the Door"
 "Clap Clap"
 "Keeps Me Coming Back"
 "Masters of Deception"
 "Boyz and Girlz"
 "Pick Up Yer Number"
 "Trouble on the Patio"
 "Run Through the Fire"
 "Digital Glue"

Personnel

Rusty Matyas - Vocals (lead on 2,4,6,7,9,12), Guitars, Keyboards, Trumpet
Joey Penner - Bass, Percussion, Harmonica, Backing Vocals
Matt Peters - Vocals (lead on 1,3,5,6,8,10,11), Keyboards, Guitars
Steve Senkiw - Drums, Percussion, Backing Vocals
Scott Stewart - Harmonica Guitar on 12
The Waking Eyes - Production
John Paul Peters - Production, Recording Engineer, Mix Engineer, Violin on 1 and 12
Neil Cameron - Additional Recording Engineer, Mix Engineer
Phil Demetro - Mastering
Chris Peters - Art Design and Artwork
Joshua Ruth - Band Photography
Alek Rzeszowski - Layout

References

2008 albums
The Waking Eyes albums